Simon Coleman is a British anthropologist who serves as a Chancellor Jackman Chaired Professor in the Department for the Study of Religion at the University of Toronto. He has taught at Durham University and Sussex University, as well. He has served as the editor of The Journal of the Royal Anthropological Institute. He has published studies of Charismatic Christianity and Prosperity theology, particularly focusing on the Word of Faith movement in Europe.

Coleman attended Cambridge University, where he received a PhD.

References

Living people
British anthropologists
Alumni of the University of Cambridge
Academic staff of the University of Toronto
Year of birth missing (living people)